The city of Ottawa, Canada held municipal elections on December 6, 1954.

Mayor of Ottawa

Ottawa Board of Control
(4 elected)

Ottawa City Council

(2 elected from each ward)

References
Ottawa Citizen, December 7, 1954

Municipal elections in Ottawa
Ottawa
1950s in Ottawa
1954 in Ontario
December 1954 events in Canada